The Church of St. Petka in Staničenje is the oldest church in Pirot district, Serbia. In the Middle Ages it was known as a church of St. Nikola, a Bulgarian monument<ref>Бакалова, Елка. Сръбските учени за монументалната църковна живопис от XV век в България, Зборник радова Византолошког института XLIV, 2007, с. 500  </ref> from the beginning of the rule of tsar Ivan Alexander.

In 1967 the church was declared a Culture Monument of Exceptional Importance in Serbia. It was visited by Radivoje Ljubinković (1910–1979), adviser of the Archeological Institute in Belgrade, in 1972 and later between 1974 and 1977; he conducted a research program on the archeological site, which led to preserving the church's architecture and frescoes in 1979. Final conservation and restoration of painted walls (frescoes) was made between 1975 and 1978 by Zdenka Živković, picture restorer from Belgrade.

The church is located near Pirot, about 10 kilometers west at the foot of Belava Mountain. It was built on an elevated plateau above the river coast of Nišava, near Staničenje village and the confluence of Temštica, near the main road from Sofia to Niš. In the fresco epitaph located on the west wall above the entrance, it was noted that Arsenije, Jefimija, Konstantin and some others (whose names were erased over the years) constructed and painted the church in 1331 and 1332, at the time of Bulgarian Emperor Joan Asen (Ivan Alexander) and Vidin master Belaur. A narthex with an open wooden porch was added in the 19th century.

 History 

 Construction period 
Without a doubt, the oldest church in the Ponišavlje is Church of St. Nikola, later known as church of Parascheva in Staničenje. The fresco epitaph which is written on the west wall above the entrance was noted that Arsenije, Jefimija, Konstantin and some other members, whose names were erased by the time, painted and built the church between 1331. and 1332. in the time of Bulgarian Emperor Joan Asen (bug. Ivan Asen) and Vidin master, Bulgarian noble Belaur. People mentioned on the fresco epitaph was already dead in that time, when the church was built, so the construction was finished by their son, lord of higher rank, along with his wife, whose name remains unknown to us due the damage on the wall which destroyed part of frescoes. Jovan Aleksandar Asen (1331–1371) was a ruler who was mentioned in the fresco epitaph, which was named Asen as his second family name.  Belaur was one of the most powerful Bulgarian boyars and the uncle of Emperor Jovan Aleksandar at the same time, and he raise revolt against him in 1331. and tear apart Bulgarian state around Vidin and the Danube. Emperor Dušan, referred to Jovan in an autobiographical note in his code as one of the seven rulers who threatened the Serbian state, meaning on a significant victory in the battle near Ćustendil (bug. Велбъжд) in 1330, where Dušan won against Bulgarians and their allies. Later build narthex and porch on the south side of the church was not preserved.  A narthex with an open wooden porch was built in the 19th century.

 Turbulent times 
In the medieval historical facts we can find no written data about church of St. Nikola in Staničenje. In the search for possible source of data it was presented the assumption that the church was mentioned as a church of St. Petka in one Turkish document, which is dated in time when Sultan Mehmed III (1595–1603) was ruling in Ottoman empire. For the later period, in several historical sources of data was recorded statements which illuminate the fate of the church in Staničenje in the late 18th century and the first decades of the 19th century. It was a noted some memories of archpriest Aleksa Minčić from Staničenje which reads:
Long ago, it must have been in the late 18th century, here in the church of Staničenje, all people who were there and all present priests were killed, so after that the church was closed in the next 30 years. And it was like this: one year, just for Annunciation, in the time, when the priests organized a Divine Liturgy, in the church and the churchyard were many people. Suddenly, Kardzhali start attack to the church and churchyard, when began the most horrible killing and slaughering of people and priests. All people and priests were killed that day. Everything was plundered and the church was almost destroyed in that Kardzhali action. And today, when someone starts digging wherever in the churchyard, it revealed the human bones of killed people in that day on the Annunciation. Since then the church in Staničenje could not longer serve to its purpose until the 1829. In that time, church did not have a priest because they were often killed. In  that year, 1829. people in Staničenje get one priest and they ask landowner to allow them to recover back the church so it can serve the purpose. Landowner accommodate them under the condition that they must give him, in a name of church holiday which is 26th July, a sterile sheep every year. People of Staničenje recovered the church and it began to serve again to its purpose, and the landowner, since that year, received sterile sheep from the village every year.

Thanks to some surviving records, that event can be reliably dated to the 1976. In a liturgical book of the Monastery of St. Dimitrije near Bela Palanka was recorded that those years Kardzhali plundered and burned many villages and towns. The same event was mentioned in the record of priest Nikola on a manuscript of the Gospel, which is now held in Sofia.
Church of Staničenje was desecrated for the last time when was the liberation from the Turks. During the retreat of Turkish army, and in upcoming of Serbian army in the fall of 1877.  the Circassians made a general plunder and desecrate the church in Staničenje and burned all the liturgical books.

 The first church bells 
During the restoration which followed soon after the liberation, this old church received its first church bells. On one of them is a relief of St. Sava and inscription which says:
 "After 500 years of slavery, for the first time we pour out a bell in remembrance of our posterity and for the glory of the church of St. Petka – Staničenje municipality."
At the bottom of the bell it is graved 1882. On the second bell is only the inscription:
 "To commemorate our liberation from the Turks, and to the glory of our King Milan M. Obrenović and we pour out this bell – From Villagers of Staničenje to our church St. Petka."
Around the perimeter of the bottom of the bell was inscribed "Đorđe Bota and the sons" and also the year of 1882.

 Era after the liberation from the Turks 
In an attempt to obtain more information from a possible chronicles and residual memories, Radivoje Ljubinković, during archeological works, was conducted a questionnaire among the oldest inhabitants of the village. On that occasion, he learned that the church before exploration, in the last 100 years (which means, after the liberation in 1877.) was not significantly rebuilt or enlarged and the final form was the form from that time after the liberation of Ottoman empire. He recorded the legend, that the main church in the village was the church of St. Jovan the Baptist, once located near the present cemetery and after its demolition, church of St. Petka became a village temple. The founder of the Serbian Archeological Society and the member-trustee of Pirot district was Jovan Popović, a teacher from Staničenje. The first issue of the Starinar, from 1884., was published his reports from the field and findings from area of  village Staničenje. It’s very interesting that this teacher, which was highly educated, was not mentioned St Petka church in Staničenje in that time, apparently because he wasn’t recognized medieval settlement that was humble.

 Architecture 

 Location and construction stages 

The elevated plateau above the coast of Nišava river and its local micro-ambience, where the church is located, represents a dominant strategic position. Soil composition on which church was built consist of  fluvial sediments – land with sand and fine gravel and lots of pebbles of various sizes, from very small to large ones which is about 20–30 centimeters in diameter. During the research it was founded that the oldest cultural layer, formed at the site, was from the time when the church was constructed. Lonely discovery of a Byzantine fibula, then discovery of bricks mostly of their fragments incorporated as spoils, embossed altar as a base of recent altars, does not indicate the existence of an ancient layer. During the research of the church and its surrounding churchyard was noticed several construction phases in the lifetime of this sacred building through several centuries, where the oldest phase is construction of the feudal temple of St. Nikola which get a porch in next years and a whole ensemble is a vivid in 1331–1332. In the second phase, after the destruction of narthex and some time, on its place was built open narthex, in other words, ordinary porch. This upgrade is not precisely appropriated in time but it could be assumed that it is not younger than the end of the 16th century. The next two phases of extensions and upgrades can be reliably dated to the 18th century, rather before the 1796. when the old temple in Staničenje take severe damage.

The third phase, on the place of earlier porch was built half-timbered narthex and then along the southern side of the church was built annex longitudinal rectangular in shape which is placed in the fourth phase of the construction of the temple intervention. The fifth phase was classified as restoration of an old church in Staničenje which was conducted in 1829. That was when it got the form in which it was founded in 1972. tentatively,  the last phase of construction of the church was represented as a conservation and restoration works carried out from 1973 to 1976, when was rebuilt and restored open narthex on St. Nikola church in Staničenje, when it got its final form.

 The original construction 

 Basis and the composition of the wall of the temple 

In the first phase, St. Nikola's church was built as a humble rectangular church with semi-circular altar apse on the east with a total length of 8.9 meters and a width of 5.1 meters. Arched barrel vault, built of cut limestone, whose themes is about 5.6 meters above the floor level. The walls were crudely constructed with bumps that are visible on the surface, which is covered with paintings.  Their uneven thicknesses are decreasing towards the higher zones. Northern and southern walls, closer to the floor, are approximately 0,9 meters, while in the level of arch does not exceed 0.7–0.8 meters. A similar phenomenon can be seen in the wall of apse, which is slightly more massive on the ground level – over 1 meter thick. The foundation walls are very shallow (0.3–0.4 meters) and roughly built wall mass inculcation in incorrect or barrel dug trench. The materials in the walls are almost entirely the boulders from river with mortar binder. The walls were reinforced with wooden fittings (beams of square cross section, from 15×15 centimeters to 18×18 centimeters) which were located inside the structure of the wall mass – two parallel beams were placed in horizontal lines at the distance between them were 0.7 to 0.8 meters vertically. On the outside part of walls occurs only below the roof cornice and they cutting at the same level both gable ends. From the inside part of the wall, outer beam, covered only with a layer of fresco plaster was noticed only at the base of the vault. In the west wall, was modeled modest entrance with stone sill and shallow jambs that were not specifically handled or curved but them coming out from the wall mass stubble on that side of the wall. Ceiling transom consists of a series of beams of square cross section and in that context there was a wooden structure with double doors.

 The interior of church 
The interior of the church was illuminated only by two small windows. One window, highly elevated (about 3 meters) above the floor level, was placed just below the arch in the central part of the southern wall. It was modeled in the form of round-arched niche, with a relatively narrow opening to the outside part of the wall. Later, that window was bricked but its original form of that window with fresco decoration was preserved. There was a similar window above the altar table in the wall of the altar apse. It was later replaced by a larger window during the reconstruction, but during conservation work it was restored as like other one from the south wall. The interior was decorated with frescoes, painted on the walls which was divided with one wall in two compartments that which was in later phase removed. That wall was built as a massive wall with 0.55 meters in thickness  and it was tall about 2.3 meters. On the top side of that wall was placed molded cornice which protracted along the northern, western and southern wall, separating the first zone with a gallery of paintings and founder fresco-portraits with an inscription which says that Arsenije, Jefimija i Konstan built the church in 1331-1332.
By placing the altar partition wall was separated the nave, 4.2×3.35 meters, from the large altar space. Due to the limited area of the altar, the original altar table which was made of bricks was set up with the apse wall. Only remaining of that altar table is print of the surrounding mural, surrounded by a red border and a substructure discovered during archeological excavations. It was tall, about 1m from the floor level and it had shingle on the top of it, approximately 0.7 meters wide, which stood on a stone column.

 The roof of the church 
The temple was covered with roof plates, as evidence by the fact that there were no remains of roof tiles and no traces of lead roof. The cornice, which has not been preserved in its original form, was probably made of a series of roughly dressed stone stabs.

 The narthex of the church 
Shortly after the church was built, narthex was upgraded to the temple which had a length of 4 meters of internal space, but because of deviation of the northern wall the width of narthex is unequal. narthex has 4.6 meters in length by facade and approximately 4 meters from the west side. The walls, of original narthex, was 0.8 to 0.85 meter thick, shallow grounded about 0.3 meters deep, therefore its preserved only in parts. Under later rearrangement, the significant part of the south wall was vanished and destroyed and the central part of the west wall along with a last of the entrance was also destroyed.
According to the founder caption and information obtained by archeological excavations, St Nikola church in Staničenje was built during the third decade of the 14th century.  During that period, first was built a church with nave basis and after that, perhaps only a few years later, built-on a porch. This extension preceded of the painting in the nave and narthex, which ended in 1331-1332.

 The paintings in the temple 

 Founders and donors inscription 

According to the luxury clothing, jewellery, and wealth of figures painted on the walls, the village of Staničenje stands out from the monuments of that time. A well-organized group of painters carried out whole gallery of portraits on the western part of the nave, composed of ten figures. Several portraits were painted in the narthex but over the time only the fresco fragments remains which were stored in the Gallery of Frescoes in Belgrade. Shown costumes on noblemen figures, aristocrats, monks and nuns of different ages are important source of material for understanding the aristocratic and royal costumes of that period.
The founder’s inscription was written on the inner west wall, above the entrance to the church, covering the entire width of the lintel. The text was written in four rows on the white basis with black letters of unequal size and it says that several persons participated in the construction and painting process of church. The text begins with trinity invocation on Church Slavonic language: “Izvolenijem Otca I savršenijem Sina I sapospešenijem”, which was normal for the founding labels of the Serbian and Bulgarian people in the Middle Ages. At the start, before the first word was preceded a small painted cross saved partially (lat. Invocatio symbolica) which in the Middle Ages  usually began and ended the inscriptions of this kind. Strangeness of founders inscription in Staničenje is that a mention of the Bulgarian Emperor brings us to the name of Vidin master Balaur. Also, the label reveals the fact which was unprecedented in other already known sources. We discover here that Balaur was co-ruler, which is important proof of its real power within the Bulgarian elite.

 Frescoes 

Pictorial program in the church has been preserved in most. Inside the church, frescoes on the barrel vault were destroyed but rest of fresco program can be easily analyzed and they thematically look good. Quality of frescoes, paintings and their details was diminished because of pulverization process which was used on frescoes, which are visible on all parts of the painted ensemble, and because of that process frescoes appear to be covered with a layer of gray scum. Considerable amount of detail, especially on skin tones figure was lost forever. Little has been written so far about Staničenje. In the first report that Radivoje and Marijana Ljubinković published after the archeological and conservative-architectural works on the church, it was pointed to this monument which in science was unknown until that day. Unfortunately, frescoes in village Staničenje were remained largely incomplete.
Frescoes painted on the barrel vault in the nave were almost destroyed, which contained standing figures of Prophets from Old Testament. That conclusion became according to the small remains of the frescoes on that place of nave, which for iconographic was quite expected. On the southern half, the eastern part of that, on frescoes was illustrated few standing figures so when we look how much frescoes are destroyed in that part of the church, we get a conclusion that at least there have been 10 or more figures on one side of arch, so above 20 in total.
Small dimension of structure was caused to have reduced program of frescoes in the altar. In altar, as the most visible fact was that was no scene of Holy Communion of the Apostles. The frescoes from the vault and the arch – Ascension of Christ and the Virgin Mary – belong to the already considered of great holidays. Conch of the apse contains unusual representing of the Virgin Mary with Christ on a throne with St. Nikola and St. Kiril the philosopher and in the area below was adoration to the sacrifice of Christ. In the niche prosthesis is half naked dead Christ, and on the walls are three standing figures of St. Deacons, and on the east and south walls are deacon’s frontal busts of two bishops.
The content of frescoes on the east wall of the narthex consists of the following parts:
 cycle patron of the church,
 frieze of busts of saints,
 standing figures in the first zone,
 High-placed decorative belt.
Unlike frescoes in the nave, the remaining frescoes in the narthex weren’t protected over a long period and they have been faded and parished during the time. Reading of that frescoesis very difficult and stylistic features can not be tracked. Three upper zones of the frescoes are dedicated cycle of St. Nikola, patron of Staničenje. In the lower part, starting from the north, are located composition of three Dukes in dungeon. Illustration are the part of famous miracles of St. Nikola, but in Staničenje are incompletely preserved. We can only recognize a figure part one of the three wrongly accused Dukes by the emperor Konstantin whom puts them to the dungen, as its noted in written sources of St. Nikola.

 Legends about how the church change name 
There are two legends about how church changes the name from St. Nikolas Church in the name of St. Petka Church:
 The first legend dates from the 1398. and it says how Princess Milica was dealing with a diplomatic activities, and she and Jefimija were gone together to the Sultan Bajazit to represents the interests of St. Srefan that year. On that occasion she obtained the transfer of relics of St. Petka from Vidin to Belgrade. According to the legend, the relics stayed overnight in Staničenje in the church of St. Nikola. After that, the relics were placed in the chapel of St. Petka at Kalemegdan and today they are in the Romanian city Iași.
 The second legend is more a fact of history. On 25 March 1796. according to the old calendar of the Annunciation of the Virgin Maria, that day there were a lot of people in the church and churchyard  when Turkish Kardzhali started attacking and slaughtering all present people, even priest was not spared.  Since then, the church did not open its door for the next 30 years. Upon reopening, church changed name to Church of St. Petka. In recent time, church holiday is St. Petka from Trnovo, 8. of August.

 A founder’s grave 

In the nave of the church, there are four burial graves, heavily damaged by digging after the funeral. Something better preserved is the grave no.23, buried along the southern wall. In the oak chest, of which only parts visible, was buried a young aristocrat woman. Judging from the preserved parts, she had a gilded robes on which was identified the ornaments of two-headed eagles, at the time of the excavation. On the ribbon of made of silver thread, thrown over her head, there were luxurious earrings. In her tomb was found the crop, one-third of the small silver coin. By hers tomb was another similar wooden oak chest, grave 22., from which remained only smaller parts. On the place where was one been head of the deceased, laid on a stone slab, was discovered a crop, one-third small silver coin – the same as in the tomb of the young aristocrat woman. Both coffins were simultaneously washed down with a plaster mass with a little stone, which were well preserved in the gap between sides they shared by.
Place of the founder’s tomb predetermined position of grave with no.15, buried on the outside of the southern wall of the narthex.  Wooden coffin was walled and vaulted with distinctive design. On remains of the deceased male younger age person, were founded parts of a robe with 27 silver buttons with gold embroidered work, where in addition to ornamental detail, preserved metopes with the name of the Emperor Jovan Aleksandar. The embroidery in gold appears to have been
made in an atelier working for the Bulgarian royal court.

 References 

 Notes 

 Books М. Popović, S. Gabelić, B. Cvetković, B. Popović,'' Church of St Nikola in Staničenje, 2005, Belgrade, 

Buildings and structures in Pirot
Cultural Monuments of Great Importance (Serbia)